Samuel Nixon (30 June 1804, London – 1854) was a portrait sculptor in London, England.

Career 
Nixon's workshop was at 2 White Hart, Bishopsgate (1838–1854). Nixon worked for his friend Henry Doulton who established Royal Doulton. 
He is most well known for the Devonshire granite sculpture of William IV (1844), which was originally located near London Bridge on King William St. and was moved to Greenwich in 1935. Gentleman's Magazine called it "a striking and imposing object… a masterpiece" and "one of the chief ornaments of the City of London." It was, they wrote, "admired by all who are capable of appreciating artistic genius."

He repeatedly exhibited at the Royal Academy (1824–1846).

Nixon also worked on Goldsmiths' Hall. He created the four marble statues of children that he entitled The Four Seasons (1844). The statues stand on four pedestals on the lower flight of the grand staircase. Gentleman's Magazine described as "a work of the highest merit ... such beautiful personifications." The Illustrated London News declared "'The Goldsmiths' is the most magnificent of all the Halls of the City of London." The white marble statues of "The Seasons" are described as "exquisite" and that Nixon achieved "extreme delicacy" with his "masterly chisel."

Gentleman's Magazine indicated that he has "been employed principally in Sepulchre sculpture, and had executed numerous works of a superior character in that class, many of which have been sent to Canada."

He died at Kennington House, Kennington Common in 1854.

Family 

Nixon was the seventh child of Thomas and Sarah Nixon, he was baptised at St Mary-at-Hill on 29 July. His elder brother was James Henry Nixon (1802–1857), a painter on glass. He was also the uncle of James Thomas Nixon.

Gallery

Works 
 In 1826 he exhibited at the Royal Academy ‘The Shepherd,’ in 1828 ‘The Reconciliation of Adam and Eve after the Fall,’ in 1830 ‘The Birth of Venus,’ and in 1831 ‘The Infant Moses.’ 
 Shakespeare (plaster bust after Shakespeare's funerary monument), City of London School (1846)
 John Stow, Plaster bust, (after bust in St Andrew Undershaft), City of London School
Sir John Crosby, Crosby Hall, Bishopsgate Street
 Birth of Venus
Dean Andrews (minister), St Nicolas Church, Great Bookham, Surrey
 The ‘Four Seasons’, Goldsmiths’ Hall, City of London, grand staircase
 Rev.William Rodber, St Mary-at-Hill
 William Johnson Rodber, St Mary-at-Hill (1843)
 Richard Johnston Rodber
 Rev. William Parker, St Ethelburga's Bishopsgate
Thomas Reynolds, Boxmoor, Herts 
Samuel Whiteway, Kingsteignton, Devon 
 A relief bust of John Milton, Sotheby Olympia, 25 April 2002; private coll
 Richard Cobden, Bronze statuette after S. Nixon. Marshall Library of Economics, Cambridge. (1846) 
George Wynch, Pett, Sussex (1836) 
 The Gillespie Monument, St. John's Wood Chapel
Philip Lucas (minister), Hackney (parish) (1830)
Revd. George Avery Hatch, St Vedast Foster Lane (1837)
Martha Hatch, daughter of Henry Emlyn of Windsor”, St Vedast Foster Lane
John Marshall, St. Leonard's, Shoreditch
Design for the principal door of the House of Lords, illustrating scenes from the life of Alfred the Great

Links 
Samuel Nixon – A Biographical Dictionary of Sculptors in Britain, 1660–1851
 Dictionary of National Biography, vol. 41

See also 
List of monumental masons

References 

English sculptors
1804 births
1854 deaths
People from the City of London